Crotalus lepidus is a venomous pit viper species found in the southwestern United States and northern central Mexico. Four subspecies are currently recognized, including the nominate subspecies described here.

Description
 
This small species rarely exceeds 32 in (81.3 cm) in length. It has a large, rounded head, and fairly heavy body for its size, with eyes with vertical pupils. Like other rattlesnakes, its tail has a rattle, which is composed of keratin. Each time the snake sheds its skin, a new segment is added to the rattle. However, the rattle is fragile and may break off, and the frequency of shedding can vary. So, the snake's age cannot be determined by the number of segments or length of the rattle.

The color pattern varies greatly, but generally reflects the color of the rock in the snake's natural environment. Snakes found near areas of predominantly limestone tend to be a light grey in color, with darker grey banding. Snakes found at higher altitudes have darker colors. Specimens of the mottled rock rattlesnake (C. l. lepidus) from the Davis Mountains region often exhibit a more pink coloration, with dark-grey speckling rather than distinct banding. The banded rock rattlesnake (C. l. klauberi) gets its common name from its distinctive, clean banding, often with little speckling or mottling.

Common names
Its common names include: blue rattlesnake, eastern rock rattlesnake, green rattlesnake, little green rattlesnake, pink rattlesnake, rock rattlesnake, Texas rock rattlesnake, and white rattlesnake.

Geographic range
This snake is found in the Southwestern United States (Arizona, southern New Mexico, and southwestern Texas) and northern central Mexico. The type locality given is "Presidio del Norte and Eagle Pass" (Texas, USA). H.M. Smith and Taylor (1950) emended the type locality to "Presidio (del Norte), Presidio County, Texas".

Conservation status
This species is classified as Least Concern IUCN Red List of Threatened Species (v3.1, 2001). Species are listed as such due to their wide distribution, presumed large population, or because they are unlikely to be declining fast enough to qualify for listing in a more threatened category. The population trend was stable when assessed in 2006.

However, it is listed as a threatened species by New Mexico, although Texas does not protect it. Its habitat is largely inaccessible, and not currently threatened by human development, though it is gradually becoming more and more fragmented.

Behavior
In general, these snakes are not aggressive. They tend to rely heavily on their camouflage, and will often not strike or even rattle their tails unless physically harassed. They spend most of their lives in rocky outcroppings and talus slopes, from which they are named. Man-made road cuts are often a favorite place. They are primarily nocturnal. Most people who get bitten by the rock rattlesnake are often hiking among rocks, where it lives. If someone steps or accidentally touches it, the snake's immediate reaction is to bite.

Feeding
Their diets consist of small mammals, lizards, and sometimes frogs. They are often more active at colder temperatures than other rattlesnake species.

Captivity
Two subspecies, C. l. lepidus and C. l. klauberi, are frequently available in the exotic animal trade, and are well represented in zoos around the world. They are sought after for their wide array of potential colorations and typically docile nature. Most available are wild-caught; captive breeding, while not unheard of, is not commonplace. The two subspecies found only in Mexico are not often found in captivity outside of Mexico.

Reproduction
These snakes are ovoviviparous. They breed once a year, in the spring, and give birth about four months later to six to eight young. The young generally look like miniature versions of the parents and take three or more years to mature.

Venom
Their venom is primarily a hemotoxin, but has been known to have significant neurotoxic effects, as well. While not type-specific, the polyvalent antivenin CroFab is generally used to treat serious envenomations.

Subspecies

A recent review  showed that the Tamualipan rock rattlesnake appears to be a separate species, Crotalus morulus

References

Further reading
 Kennicott, R. 1861. On three new forms of Rattlesnakes. Proc. Acad. Nat. Sci. Philadelphia 13: 205-208. (Caudisona lepida, p. 206.)

External links

 
 Rock rattlesnake at Chihuahuan Desert Museum and Gardens. Accessed 12 December 2007.
 Crotalus lepidus at University of Texas. Accessed 12 December 2007.
 Mottled rock rattlesnake at kingsnake.com. Accessed 12 December 2007.

lepidus
Reptiles described in 1861
Fauna of the Chihuahuan Desert
Reptiles of Mexico